This Is Not a Drill is the seventh concert tour by English songwriter Roger Waters. The tour, originally scheduled to take place between July and October 2020, was suspended after the COVID-19 pandemic advance, and rescheduled to take place in 2022. It began at the PPG Paints Arena in Pittsburgh, United States, on July 6, 2022, and it's scheduled to end at the AO Arena of Manchester on June 10, 2023. Waters first talked about a new live spectacle following his Us + Them Tour on a Rolling Stone interview in September 2019. In 2021, he called the show his "first farewell tour".

Background 
In 2017, Waters released his fourth solo album Is This the Life We Really Want?, conceived as a radio play about a man and his granddaughter investigating why children are being killed in other parts of the world. Waters described the play as "part magic carpet ride, part political rant, part anguish".

To promote the album, Waters embarked on the Us + Them Tour, visiting the Americas, Europe and Oceania between May 2017 and December 2018. A portion of the show featured extensive anti-Donald Trump imagery set to songs released by Pink Floyd, which led some attendees to boo or even walk out of the show. Waters responded to the anti-Trump critics by saying, "I find it slightly surprising that anybody could have been listening to my songs for 50 years without understanding", and said to those critics if they didn't like what he was doing, "Go see Katy Perry or watch the Kardashians. I don't care."

After finishing the tour, a film about it, called Roger Waters: Us + Them, was released. In September 2019, in an interview promoting the film, Waters talked to Rolling Stone about his plans for the future, where he first mentioned the main concept for a following tour:

It will be even more political than Us + Them was — political and humane. We were listening to songs and looking at set lists today. We were talking about, what should we call it? I shouldn't be giving this away, but I don't give a shit because it will probably all change, but imagine the iconic helicopter that normally comes before “Happiest Days” and “Brick 2” — that noise that we all know and love — and imagine a megaphone, somebody abused this device before, I know — but, “This is not a drill.” I thought that could be a good title for the show: This Is Not a Drill. The ruling class is killing us.

In the same interview, Waters stated the tour would only visit arenas, with no concerts held in outdoor venues, and it would visit cities in United States, Canada, "and maybe three gigs in Mexico City. And that’s all. I can’t go off around the world, and I don’t really want to either".

Development 

In January 2020, Waters officially announced the tour, named This Is Not a Drill. "This tour will be part of a global movement by people who are concerned by others to affect the change that is necessary", said Waters in a video announcing the tour. "That’s why we’re going on the road. That’s why speak to each other in pubs. That’s why this conversation should be on everybody’s lips, constantly, the whole time, because it’s super important. So I hope you’ll all come to the shows." The show sees him performing in a 360° stage for the first time. Originally, the final show in the United States was due to take place on October 3, 2020, exactly one month before the 2020 presidential election.

On March 27, 2020, Waters posted a statement on his website and social media, announcing the postponement of the tour to the following year due to the coronavirus pandemic outbreak, declaring that the situation was a "Bummer, but if it saves one life, it’s worth it". In April 2021, tour dates in Canada and United States were announced to take place in 2022, while the concerts in Mexico were announced later in June. In a statement, it was specified that the show "includes a dozen great songs from Pink Floyd’s Golden Era alongside several new ones — words and music, same writer, same heart, same soul, same man". Waters has called This Is Not a Drill his "first farewell tour". In November 2021, a new show in Monterrey, Mexico, was announced, followed by three new shows in the United States announced later in March 2022. Concerts in North America took place between July and October 2022.

Rehearsals for the tour began around June 13, 2022 in Southampton, with the first full rehearsal taking place on June 16. Sean Evans, Waters' tour creative director, reprises his role for this tour, creating all visuals and stage design. To promote the tour, Waters and his band made an appearance on The Late Show with Stephen Colbert on June 21, and performed a medley of songs from The Wall.

At the beginning of every concert, a voiceover described by journalist James Ball as "a plummy British announcer" requests audience members to turn off their cell phones, and to "fuck off to the bar" if they like Pink Floyd but "can’t stand Roger’s politics". Waters debuted a new song at the show, titled "The Bar", which was written during lockdown.  

In September 2022, contrary to what Waters expressed previously, the first concerts in Europe were officially announced on his website and social media, with more expected to follow. Concerts will take place between March and June 2023.

Controversies

In February 2020, following the showing of advertisements for the tour on some Major League Baseball platforms, Jewish organization B'nai B'rith criticized MLB's decision to showing the ads and sponsor the tour. The organization wrote a letter to commissioner Rob Manfred, where they stated Waters’ views on Israel "far exceed the boundaries of civil discourse". As a result of this, the league decided to pull advertising for the tour in all its platforms and cut any ties to Waters. Waters has supported the Boycott, Divestment and Sanctions (BDS) movement in solidarity with Palestinians against Israeli occupation of the Palestinian territories since 2011.

In July 2022, during an interview with The Globe and Mail, Waters questioned the journalist about the lack of coverage of the first of his two shows in Toronto, Canada. When replied that the date coincided with the opening show of the Weeknd's After Hours til Dawn Tour (which was ultimately postponed) and that his "wasn’t the biggest in town that night", Waters declared not to know who the Weeknd is, and questioned why his concert was not reviewed on the following night. He continued by saying  his statement was not "a personal attack", adding "with all due respect to the Weeknd or Drake or any of them, I am far, far, far more important than any of them will ever be, however many billions of streams they’ve got. There is stuff going on here that is fundamentally important to all of our lives". Rolling Stone commented on the controversy that "it is unclear by which metric Waters measures importance".

In September 2022, Waters wrote an open letter to Ukrainian first lady Olena Zelenska in response to her interview in Sunday with Laura Kuenssberg, in which he criticized the country's stance in the Russo-Ukrainian War, blaming the West and Washington particularly for supplying Ukraine with weapons and "extreme nationalists" for having "set your country on the path to this disastrous war", while calling for an end to the conflict. After Zelenska replied with a tweet, Waters posted a second letter calling for an end of the armed conflict, and the start of negotiations. In reaction to the letters, Tauron Arena in Kraków, Poland, stated that the concerts in the venue, which were to be held on April 21 and 23, 2023, would no longer take place, with an official saying "Roger Waters' manager decided to withdraw... without giving any reason". Waters was also declared persona non grata in the city after a proposal from Łukasz Wantuch, a member of the Kraków City Council. While the concerts no longer appear in his website, Waters posted a letter in social media denying the decision to cancel was his and saying that if the cancelation is confirmed, "it will be a sad loss for me, because I have been looking forward to sharing my message of love with the people of Poland", and that Wantuch's "draconian censoring of my work will deny them the opportunity to make up their own minds". In a Rolling Stone interview with journalist James Ball, Waters claimed to be "on a kill list that is supported by the Ukrainian government". Ball complemented that while there is a list maintained by a far-right Ukrainian organization, its site claims not to be a kill list but rather "information for law enforcement authorities and special services".

Setlist 

The following set list was obtained from the concert held on July 6, 2022 at the PPG Paints Arena in Pittsburgh.

Set 1
 "Comfortably Numb 2022"
 "The Happiest Days of Our Lives"
 "Another Brick in the Wall, Part 2"
 "Another Brick in the Wall, Part 3"
 "The Powers That Be"
 "The Bravery of Being Out of Range"
 "The Bar"
 "Have a Cigar"
 "Wish You Were Here"
 "Shine On You Crazy Diamond (Parts VI-VIII)"
 "Sheep"

Set 2
 "In the Flesh"
 "Run Like Hell"
 "Déjà Vu"
 "Is This the Life We Really Want?"
 "Money"
 "Us and Them"
 "Any Colour You Like"
 "Brain Damage"
 "Eclipse"
Encore
"Two Suns in the Sunset"
 "The Bar" (reprise)
 "Outside the Wall"

 During some concerts, part VIII of "Shine On You Crazy Diamond" has been replaced with part V.

Releases
The tour debuted a new stripped down "haunting organ and vocals version"  of Comfortably Numb as the show's opener every night.

On November 17, 2022, Waters released an official recording of "Comfortably Numb 2022" with an accompanying video that was produced and directed by Sean Evans. “Comfortably Numb 2022” was recorded at various studio during Waters' This Is Not A Drill North American tour (including Bias Studios outside of Washington DC, Electric Lady Studios in NYC, Armoury Studios in Vancouver, and Tree Sound Studios in Atlanta) and was produced by Roger Waters and Gus Seyffert. 

Appearing on the track are Roger Waters (vocals), Gus Seyffert (bass, synth, percussion, vocals), Joey Waronker (drums), Dave Kilminster (vocals), Jonathan Wilson (harmonium, synth, guitar and vocals), Jon Carin (synth, vocals), Shanay Johnson (vocals), Amanda Belair (vocals), Robert Walter (organ and piano), and Nigel Godrich (strings, amp and backing vocals from Roger Waters' "The Wall Sessions").

Waters explains, "Before lockdown I had been working on a demo of a new version of ‘Comfortably Numb’ as an opener to our new show 'This Is Not A Drill'. I pitched it a whole step down, in A Minor, to make it darker and arranged it with no solos, except over the outro, where there is a heartrendingly beautiful vocal solo from one of our new sisters Shanay Johnson. It’s intended as a wakeup call, and a bridge towards a kinder future with more talking to strangers, either in 'The Bar' or just 'Passing in the Street' and less slaughter 'In Some Foreign Field.'

Boxscore data 
The concerts in the United States and Canada ranked #31 on Billboards Boxscore Charts, grossing $66,330,771. Those shows sold 519,362 tickets.

Tour dates

Cancelled shows

Personnel 

Tour band
 Roger Waters – vocals, bass guitar, acoustic guitar, electric guitar, piano
 Jon Carin – keyboards, guitar, pedal steel guitar, vocals, Marxophone
 Dave Kilminster – guitar, vocals
 Jonathan Wilson – guitar, vocals
 Gus Seyffert – bass guitar, guitar, vocals, accordion
 Joey Waronker – drums, percussion
 Amanda Belair – background vocals, percussion
 Shanay Johnson – background vocals, percussion 
 Robert Walter – Hammond B3 organ, keyboards, piano, melodica
 Seamus Blake - saxophone, clarinet

Notes
The touring band was confirmed on their appearance on The Late Show with Stephen Colbert in June.
Producer and saxophonist Ian Ritchie confirmed that while he was intended to be part of the tour, he had to step down during rehearsals due to health issues.

Notes

References 

Roger Waters concert tours
2022 concert tours
2023 concert tours
Concert tours postponed due to the COVID-19 pandemic